The 1973 European Athletics Junior Championships was the second edition of the biennial athletics competition for European athletes aged under twenty. It was held in Duisburg, West Germany between 24 and 26 August.

Men's results

Women's results

Medal table

References

Results
European Junior Championships 1973. World Junior Athletics History. Retrieved on 2013-05-29.

European Athletics U20 Championships
European Junior
Sport in Duisburg
International athletics competitions hosted by West Germany
1973 in German sport
1973 in youth sport